John C. Tyson (1926 – November 2, 2012) was an American jurist.

Tyson received his bachelors and law degrees from the University of Alabama, After working in the Alabama Attorney General office, Tyson was appointed to the Alabama Court of Criminal Appeals. He also served as a special justice on the Alabama Supreme Court.

Notes

1926 births
2012 deaths
University of Alabama alumni
University of Alabama School of Law alumni
Alabama state court judges
20th-century American judges